The 2006 Pendle Borough Council election took place on 4 May 2006 to elect members of Pendle Borough Council in Lancashire, England. One third of the council was up for election and the Liberal Democrats stayed in overall control of the council.

After the election, the composition of the council was
Liberal Democrat 30
Conservative 13
Labour 5
British National Party 1

Background
Before the election the Liberal Democrats held a majority with 29 seats, compared to 11 for the Conservatives, 7 for Labour and 1 seat was vacant. 18 of the 49 seats on the council were contested at the election, with 2 seats available in Reedley and Vivary Bridge wards. Candidates in the election came from the Conservative, Labour and Liberal Democrat parties, as well as 7 from the British National Party.

Election result
The results saw the Liberal Democrats retain a majority on the council, while the British National Party won a first seat on the council. Brian Parker gained Marsden for the British National Party from Labour by 80 votes, with the leader of the British National Party Nick Griffin saying he was "very pleased" and hoped "we can go on and progress in the future". However the other parties expressed concern over the success for the British National Party. Meanwhile, among the other successful candidates in the election was Liberal Democrat Naseem Shabnam, who became the first Asian woman councillor in Pendle after being elected in Brierfield ward. Overall turnout in the election was 43.03%.

Later in May Mohammed Iqbal was elected as the new leader of the Labour group on the council, after the previous leader Frank Clifford stood down at the election. Also towards the end of the month, councillor Marlene Hill-Crane quit the Liberal Democrats to sit as an independent, due to a dispute over the regeneration of a former school.

Ward results

References

2006 English local elections
2006
2000s in Lancashire